The 2010 Dutch National Track Championships were the Dutch national Championship for endurance and sprint disciplines for track cycling. The madison discipline took place at 16 October. The other competitions took place at Omnisport Apeldoorn in Apeldoorn, the Netherlands from December 28 to December 30, 2011. The event was organized by the KNWU, and competitions were held of various track cycling disciplines in different age, gender and disability categories.

Medal summary

Elite

Results from wielerpunt.com and cyclebase.nl.

References

External links
Official event website

 
2010 in track cycling
Track cycling
Cycling in Apeldoorn